The common frog or grass frog (Rana temporaria), also known as the European common frog, European common brown frog, European grass frog, European Holarctic true frog, European pond frog or European brown frog, is a semi-aquatic amphibian of the family Ranidae, found throughout much of Europe as far north as Scandinavia and as far east as the Urals, except for most of the Iberian Peninsula, southern Italy, and the southern Balkans. The farthest west it can be found is Ireland. It is also found in Asia, and eastward to Japan. The nominative, and most common, subspecies Rana temporaria temporaria is a largely terrestrial frog native to Europe. It is distributed throughout northern Europe and can be found in Ireland, the Isle of Lewis and as far east as Japan.

Common frogs metamorphose through three distinct developmental life stages — aquatic larva, terrestrial juvenile, and adult. They have corpulent bodies with a rounded snout, webbed feet and long hind legs adapted for swimming in water and hopping on land. Common frogs are often confused with the common toad (Bufo bufo), but frogs can easily be distinguished as they have longer legs, hop, and have a moist skin, whereas toads crawl and have a dry 'warty' skin. The spawn of the two species also differs in that frogspawn is laid in clumps and toadspawn is laid in long strings.

There are 3 subspecies of the common frog, R. t. temporaria, R. t. honnorati and R. t. palvipalmata. R. t. temporaria is the most common subspecies of this frog.

Description
In addition, its back and flanks vary in colour from olive green to grey-brown, brown, olive brown, grey, yellowish and rufous. However, it can lighten and darken its skin to match its surroundings. Some individuals have more unusual colouration—both black and red individuals have been found in Scotland, and albino frogs have been found with yellow skin and red eyes. During the mating season the male common frog tends to turn greyish-blue (see video below).

The flanks, limbs and backs are covered with irregular dark blotches and they usually sport a chevron-shaped spot on the back of their neck and a dark spot behind the eye. Unlike other amphibians, common frogs generally lack a mid-dorsal band but, when they have one, it is comparatively faint. In many countries moor frogs have a light dorsal band which easily distinguishes them from common frogs. The underbelly is white or yellow (occasionally more orange in females) and can be speckled with brown or orange. The eyes are brown with transparent horizontal pupils, and they have transparent inner eyelids to protect the eyes while underwater, as well as a 'mask' which covers the eyes and eardrums. Although the common frog has long hind legs compared to the common toad, they are shorter than those of the agile frog with which it shares some of its range. The longer hind legs and fainter colouration of the agile frog are the main features that distinguish the two species.

Males are distinguishable from females as they are smaller and have hard swellings, known as nuptial pads, on the first digits of the forelegs, used for gripping females during mating. During the mating season males' throats often turn white, and their overall colour is generally light and greyish, whereas the female is browner, or even red.

These smooth-skinned frogs can grow to an average weight of 22.7 grams and length of seven to ten centimeters (2.8-3.9 in) with colors varying from gray to green, brown, yellow, or red and may be covered in blotches. The underbelly is white or yellow often with speckles.

Habitat and distribution
Outside the breeding season, common frogs live a solitary life in damp places near ponds or marshes or in long grass. They are normally active for much of the year, only hibernating in the coldest months. In the most northern extremities of their range they may be trapped under ice for up to nine months of the year, but recent studies have shown that in these conditions they may be relatively active at temperatures close to freezing. In the British Isles, common frogs typically hibernate from late October to January. They will re-emerge as early as February if conditions are favourable, and migrate to bodies of water such as garden ponds to spawn. Where conditions are harsher, such as in the Alps, they emerge as late as early June. Common frogs hibernate in running waters, muddy burrows, or in layers of decaying leaves and mud at the bottom of ponds or lakes primarily with a current. The oxygen uptake through the skin suffices to sustain the needs of the cold and motionless frogs during hibernation.

Common frogs are found throughout much of Europe as far north as northern Scandinavia inside the Arctic Circle and as far east as the Urals, except for most of Iberia, Southern Italy, and the southern Balkans. Other areas where the common frog has been introduced include the Isle of Lewis, Shetland, Orkney and the Faroe Islands. It is also found in Asia, and eastward to Japan.

The common frog has long been thought to be an entirely introduced species in Ireland, however, genetic analyses suggest that particular populations in the south west of Ireland are indeed indigenous to the country. The authors propose that the Irish frog population is a mixed group that includes native frogs that survived the last glacial period in ice free refugia, natural post-glacial colonizers and recent artificial introductions from Western Europe.

Genetic population structure 
The common frog is a very widely distributed species, being common all throughout Europe and northwest Asia. The more peripheral subpopulations of common frogs are significantly less in number, as well as less genetically variable. There is a steep genetic decline when approaching the periphery of the common frog’s distribution range. Additionally, genetic differentiation of common frog subpopulations tends to decrease in relation to increasing latitude. The colder climates create a strong selective pressure favoring common frog populations able to behaviorally thermoregulate at a high degree.

Conservation

Long-term impact of diseases 
Of the many diseases affecting common frogs, one of the most deadly has been the ranavirus, which has been responsible for causing declines in amphibian populations across the world. Two of the main, and most deadly, symptoms caused by Ranavirus towards common frogs are skin ulcerations and hemorrhaging. Mortality rates associated with the disease are very high, in some events it is observed to be over 90%. Deaths caused by Ranavirus occur in all stages of common frog development and are concentrated mostly during the summer months. Overall, common frog populations that have been affected by Ravavirus experience consistent and substantial declines in population size.

Impact of urbanization 
Due to the widespread nature of Rana temporaria, common frogs can make their homes in both urban and rural environments. However, many of the populations living in urban environments are subject to the detrimental effects of urbanization. The construction of roads and buildings – absolute barriers to migration – has stymied gene flow and drift between urban populations of common frogs, leading to lower levels of genetic diversity in urban common frog populations compared to their rural counterparts. Urban common frog populations also experience higher levels of mortality and developmental abnormality, indicative of forced inbreeding.

However, the common frog is listed as a species of least concern on the IUCN Red List of Threatened Species.

Diet

Juvenile 
At metamorphosis, once the tadpole’s fore legs have developed, the frog does not feed for a short time. Recently metamorphosed juvenile frog mostly feed on small insects like Collembola (hexapods), Acarina (mites and ticks), and small fly larvae. Rana temporaria tadpoles, however, mostly feed on algae and decomposed plants, but once their hind legs develop, they become carnivorous.

Adults 
The common frog takes its place as an unspecialized and opportunistic feeder wherever it is located. In other words, common frogs will consume whatever prey that is most available and easy to capture. This usually means that the common frog feeds by remaining idle and waiting until a suitable prey enters the frog’s domain of capture. As a corollary, this also means that the common frog’s diet changes depending on the season where the associated prey become the most abundant. In the summer, the common frog’s diet mostly consists of adult crane flies and the larvae of butterflies and moths. To a slightly lesser extent, common frogs will feed on woodlice, arachnids, beetles, slugs, snails, and earthworms. In addition, common frogs will typically feed on bigger prey as they become larger. Therefore, newly developed common frogs are limited to smaller insect prey, whereas larger frogs are able to consume a wide range of insects. Common frogs will hide in damp places, such as in the water, during the day, and at night, they will begin searching for food.

Reproduction and mating patterns

During the spring the frog's pituitary gland is stimulated by changes in external factors, such as rainfall, day length and temperature, to produce hormones which, in turn, stimulate the production of sex cells - eggs in the females and sperm in the male. The male's nuptial pad also swells and becomes more heavily pigmented. Common frogs breed in shallow, still, fresh water such as ponds, with spawning commencing sometime between March and late June, but generally in April over the main part of their range.

Competition among males 
Like its close cousin, the moor frog (R. arvalis), R. Temporaria does not exhibit territoriality which leads to lack of physical fighting among males. During breeding season, male common frogs undergo a period of a few days (less than 10 days) where they display rapid and frenzied breeding behavior, during which the purpose of the male is to quickly find and mate with as many female frogs as possible. Higher rates of mating success in males typically have longer thumbs than single males,  which allows them to have a better grip on females.

Mating interactions 
Around three years after being born, the common frog will return to its original site of birth and release a mating call. Males will be the first to arrive at the pond and await females as they enter. During this period of pre-female competition, the pond is significantly male dominant, and there is a large amount of intrasexual competition taking place. The shallow portion of the pond, which is more suitable for egg laying, is more predominantly occupied by the larger males. However, once the females arrive, this territoriality quickly dissipates and male-female amplexed pairs are free to migrate wherever in the pond. Additionally, once engaged in an amplexus, it is rare for single males to attempt to displace or “take over” the paired male. 

It is also important to note the effect of size on a male common frog’s mating strategies. Smaller frogs, during the pre-spawning period get displaced from the shallow areas of the pond. Therefore, they circumvent this issue by searching for females on the land or in areas of the pond where they first arrive. Meanwhile, the larger frogs occupy the spawning site, where they encounter more amplexed pairs and therefore rely on their ability to displace amplexed males to secure a mate. However, the frequency of these takeovers is not consistent.

Life cycle
Female common frog clutch sizes range from a few hundred up to 5,000 eggs. Many of these eggs form large aggregates that serve to thermoregulate as well as protect the developing embryo from potential predators. By bunching the eggs together, it raises the temperature of the embryo compared to the surrounding water, which is important because the rate of tadpole development is faster in higher temperatures. Additionally, the eggs are typically laid in the shallower regions of the pond to prevent hypoxia-induced fatality of the embryos. 

It normally takes 2-3 weeks for the eggs to hatch. Afterwards, common frog larvae group up into schools where they help each other feed off of algae and larger plants, as well as avoid predators. By June and July, most tadpoles will have metamorphosized, and the remaining time until winter is used to feed and grow larger. Only the largest frogs will survive the winter, which places a large emphasis on rapid development until then. In fact, a common frog’s rate of development correlates with temperature. In lower temperature regions, common frogs will hatch earlier and metamorphosize sooner than common frogs living in warmer climate regions. Sexual maturity occurs only after three years, and common frogs will typically live between six to eight years.

Development in the presence of predators
The presence of a predator in a common frog’s early development has an effect on the metamorphosis traits of tadpole. For instance, when the predator is present in early development, it can lead to a longer larval period and were smaller in size and mass at metamorphosis. Once the predator is removed, growth rate of the tadpole returns to baseline and even exceeds what the typical growth. This influence of predator threat is only significant during early tadpole development.

One of the common frog’s most pervasive predators is the red-eared sliders (Trachemys scripta elegans), which is the most invasive species of turtles in the world. In the presence of red-eared sliders, early development common frog tadpoles exhibit longer metamorphosis times, as well as smaller size (cm) and lower body mass (g) at metamorphosis.

Thermoregulation 
As an ectotherm, the common frog is very reliant on temperature as it directly influences their metabolism, development, reproduction, muscle ability, and respiration. As such, common frogs at mid and high elevations have developed a unique set of strategies to survive in cold climates. In fact, it is due to the common frog’s ability to thermoregulate so effectively that the species has been able to become so pervasive across a multitude of environments and climates, living as far north as the Arctic circle in Scandinavia, which is further north than any other amphibian in the region. Contrary to Lithobates sylvaticus (wood frogs), common frogs do not have the ability to freeze protect themselves by increasing their levels of blood glucose to serve as a cryoprotectant. As a result, common frogs must rely on behavioral thermoregulation by seeking out warm microhabitats (such as in the soil or between rocks) during wintertime. Additionally, common frogs will commonly hibernate throughout the winter season in groups to provide bodily heating.

Social behavior 
Similar to other anuran species (Bufo americanus and Rana sylvatica), Rana temporaria are able to naturally discriminate others of its kind. Post-embryonic interaction with conspecifics is not necessary to induce associative behavior for common frogs as an adult. Rather, once common frog tadpoles have reached a certain age, they gain a strong innate associative tendency. Rana temporaria tend to aggregate as the result of environmental pressures, such as temperature or predators.

Predators
Tadpoles are eaten by fish, beetles, dragonfly larvae and birds. Adult frogs have many predators including storks, birds of prey, crows, gulls, ducks, terns, herons, pine martens, stoats, weasels, polecats, badgers, otters and snakes. Some frogs are killed, but rarely eaten, by domestic cats, and large numbers are killed on the roads by motor vehicles.

Interactions with humans and livestock
Common frogs have an important place in human ecology by controlling the insect populations. In particular, their consumption of mosquitos and other crop-damaging insects has been especially valuable. In addition, Rana temporaria, due to their ecological pervasiveness and relative abundance, have become a common laboratory specimen.

Farming
R. temporaria are farmed. Miles et al. 2004 provide improved ingredients for manufacturers of pellet food for farmed common frogs.

Due to the spread of diseases such as ranavirus, the UK based amphibian charity Froglife advised the public to avoid transporting frogspawn, tadpoles or frogs from one pond to another, even if these are close by. It has also been recommended not to place goldfish or exotic frog species in outdoor ponds as this could have a negative effect on the frog population.

References

External links

Amphibians of Europe
FrogsWatch.com Web page developed around photographs of the common frog taken in the same suburban garden over a period of 10 years. 

Rana (genus)
Amphibians of Europe
Frog, Common
Animal models
Fauna of Finland
Articles containing video clips
Amphibians described in 1758
Taxa named by Carl Linnaeus